Roberto Bonilla (born 28 September 1971) is a Guatemalan former swimmer who competed in the 1992 Summer Olympics and in the 1996 Summer Olympics.

References

1971 births
Living people
Guatemalan male swimmers
Guatemalan male freestyle swimmers
Male breaststroke swimmers
Male medley swimmers
Olympic swimmers of Guatemala
Swimmers at the 1992 Summer Olympics
Swimmers at the 1996 Summer Olympics
20th-century Guatemalan people
21st-century Guatemalan people